On February 11, 1999, an earthquake with a moderate magnitude of 6.0 and depth of 33.0 km struck Wardak and Logar provinces of south Kabul, Afghanistan.

Damage
Due to harsh weather conditions and dispersed settlements, it was difficult to assess the damage in the worst hit region, which had a combined population of about 300,000 people. The most affected districts were Maidan Shar, Nirkh, and Sayedabad in Wardak, and Baraki Barak, Pul-e-Alam and Mohammad Agha in Logar. 70 people were killed 500 were injured, and 7,000 homes collapsed due to the quake.  About 18,600 families were also affected. Many lives were saved due to foreshocks preceding the mainshock. The damage in the Wardak province is generally much severe than that of Logar. In the capital Kabul, damage such as collapsed mud walls and several injuries were also reported. Panic also spread across the city, as many people thought that they were being attacked by U.S. warplanes or missiles in the search for Osama bin Laden, who was based in Afghanistan.

See also 
List of earthquakes in 1999
List of earthquakes in Afghanistan

References

External links 

1999 earthquakes
1999 in Afghanistan
1999 02
History of Afghanistan (1992–present)
February 1999 events in Asia